Law of the Canyon is a 1947 American Western film directed by Ray Nazarro and written by Eileen Gary. The film stars Charles Starrett, Nancy Saunders, Robert 'Buzz' Henry, Texas Jim Lewis and Smiley Burnette. The film was released on April 24, 1947, by Columbia Pictures.

Plot

Cast          
Charles Starrett as Steve Langtry / The Durango Kid
Nancy Saunders as Mary Coleman
Robert 'Buzz' Henry as Spike Coleman 
Texas Jim Lewis as Guitar Player
Smiley Burnette as Smiley
Fred F. Sears as Dr. Middleton
George Chesebro as Sheriff Coleman
Edmund Cobb as T. D. Wilson
Zon Murray as Fletcher
Jack Kirk as Ben

References

External links
 

1947 films
1940s English-language films
American Western (genre) films
1947 Western (genre) films
Columbia Pictures films
Films directed by Ray Nazarro
American black-and-white films
1940s American films